Jeffrey Allen Mishler (born June 5, 1956), known professionally as Jeff Allen, is an American comedian best known for his film Happy Wife, Happy Life, Revisited. He is also known for his starring roles in several full-length comedy films, including: Bananas, Thou Shalt Laugh, Apostles of Comedy, and  Apostles of Comedy: Onwards and Upwards.

Early life 
Born in Sauk Village, Illinois, he moved to Sauk Village, Illinois at age five. Allen's father, Jack Mishler, aspired to be a painter but could only support his family as a construction worker.  His mother, Arlene Mishler, worked for 30 years at Stauffer Chemical Company.

Early career 
Allen began his career in 1978 in the comedy clubs of Chicago. Humiliated by the low pay and lack of respect, Allen, then a self-declared atheist, turned to drugs and alcohol. In 1987 he got sober and in 1997 he became a born-again Christian. As he worked clean, in the style of Bill Cosby and Jerry Seinfeld, churches became a significant venue for his act.

Personal life 
He lives in Fairview, Tennessee with his wife Tami and two children (his wife has one additional child from a previous marriage). His oldest son served with the 101st Airborne in Iraq.

References

External links 
 

1956 births
Living people
American male comedians
21st-century American comedians
American film directors
American male film actors
Christians from Illinois
Converts to Protestantism from atheism or agnosticism